The Lycée Français Charles de Gaulle (LCDG) in Ankara, Turkey is a French school in the Turkish capital. In the 2006–7 academic year, it has 484 pupils.

Mrs. Riobè and Mrs. Ménard established the school in 1942. Its initial location was near an archaeological museum.

References

External links

Official website 
Official website 

Charles de Gaulle
French international schools in Turkey
Schools in Ankara
1942 establishments in Turkey
Educational institutions established in 1942